Charlton is an English-language masculine given name that may refer to:

 Charlton Brooker (born 1971), English satirist commonly known as Charlie Brooker
 Charlton Brosius (1876–1956), American Army officer
 Charlton Eagle (born 1963), Australian tennis player
 Charlton Ehizuelen (born 1953), Nigerian track and field athlete
 Charlton Harrison (1881–1951), British civil engineer
 Charlton Heston (1923–2008), American actor
 Charlton Hill (born 1975), Australian musician
 Charlton Howard (born 2003), Australian rapper, singer, and songwriter, known professionally as the Kid Laroi
 Charlton Jimerson (born 1979), American baseball player
 Charlton Keith (born 1982), American football linebacker
 Charlton Laird (1901–1984), American linguist
 Charlton Lane (1836–1892), English amateur cricketer known as C. G. Lane
 Charlton Thomas Lewis (1834–1904), American lawyer and author
 Charlton Mashumba (born 1992), Zimbabwean footballer
 Charlton Monypenny (1867–1947), British businessman and Laird
 Charlton Nesbit (1775–1838), English wood engraver
 Charlton Nyirenda (born 1988), Malawian swimmer
 Charlton Ogburn (1911–1998), American journalist and author
 Charlton Rafaela (born 1977), Antillean sprinter
 Charlton Spinks (1877-1959), British Army officer
 Charlton W. Tebeau (1904–2000), American historian
 Charlton Templeman Speer (1859-1921), English composer and spiritualist
 Charlton Vicento (born 1991), Dutch footballer
 Charlton Wollaston (1733–1764), English medical doctor
 Charlton Wong (born 1979), Hong Kong football referee
 Charlton Young (born 1971), American college basketball assistant coach

See also
Charlton (surname)

English given names
English masculine given names
English-language masculine given names